The FBI Police is the uniformed security police of the Federal Bureau of Investigation (FBI) and is part of the Bureau's Security Division. The FBI Police is tasked with protecting key FBI facilities, properties, personnel, users, visitors, information and operations from harm and may enforce certain laws and administrative regulations.

Jurisdiction

They are endowed with full police powers of crime prevention, arrest, law enforcement and investigation within and around some key FBI facilities. They have duty stations at the following locations:

 J. Edgar Hoover Building in Washington, D.C. (FBI Headquarters)
 Washington Field Office also in Washington, D.C.
 FBI Academy in Quantico, Virginia
 FBI Laboratory, also in Quantico
 New York field office in Lower Manhattan, NY
 Criminal Justice Information Services Division in Clarksburg, West Virginia

The FBI has a cooperative agreement with the Metropolitan Police Department for the FBI Police to carry out protective duties outside of its regular patrol areas in Washington, D.C of the J. Edgar Hoover building and the Washington Field Office.

Duties and responsibilities
The primary role of the FBI Police is to deter terrorist attacks with the visible presence of a well trained, well equipped, professional police force; and provide protective security for FBI facilities from criminal acts and unauthorized access, including protecting FBI employees, official visitors and tourists.

FBI Police methods include several duties such as:

 Entrance and/or exit screening
 Patrolling in vehicles*
 Patrolling on foot
 Patrolling on bicycle
 Use of explosives detection K-9s
 Counter-surveillance

*Vehicle patrols include patrolling in cars, motorcycles and all-terrain vehicle patrols.

The FBI Police may be occasionally deployed to significant national security events, such as presidential inaugurations, the Super Bowl, conferences of world leaders as well as major political party conferences. FBI Police routinely assist in the protection of the Director of the FBI and the Attorney General. FBI Police were deployed in support of the Hurricane Katrina effort in Louisiana and in 2010 deployed to Puerto Rico to assist with an arrest operation.

Training
FBI Police recruits are required to complete a twelve-week Uniformed Police Officer Training Program at the Federal Law Enforcement Training Center followed by a four-week FBI Police Advanced Training Program at the FBI Academy and then complete five weeks of on-the-job training with a Field Training Officer in the Field Training Program.

Pay and benefits 
Salaries in the FBI Police are determined via a basic pay plan set out under the General Schedule (GS). Three levels of entry are in place for FBI Police officers, GS-7, GS-8 and GS-9. Promotion opportunities within FBI Police come with increased pay, with Corporals earning in the GS-10 band, going up the Colonel earning GS-13 pay. Additionally, FBI Police officers are covered under the Federal Employee Retirement System (FERS) and do not receive enhanced Law Enforcement Retirement (6C). The FBI Police are among the lowest paid Federal Law Enforcement Officers in the United States, and have the highest attrition rate at 17.9%. (fiscal years 2009–2010)

Other benefits available to FBI Police officers include access to health insurance, life insurance, a thrift savings plan as well as providing officers with a gym/fitness program, transportation subsidies, tuition assistance and student loan repayments.

Class action lawsuit
On August 2, 2007, a group of more than 100 FBI Police officers filed a class action complaint in the U.S. Court of Federal Claims for millions of dollars of back and future pay. The complaint alleged that the FBI had not complied with a 2002 statute, part of the FBI Reform Act, that mandated that the FBI police force be paid the same pay and benefits as members of the Uniformed Division of the United States Secret Service. The judge ruled against the FBI Police officers in February 2017. The FBI Director had not implemented the 2002 statute U.S. Code, Title 28, Section 540C to formally establish FBI Police.

In popular culture 

 The FBI Police and its vehicles were featured in the 2007 film, Live Free or Die Hard.
 The FBI Police was featured in the seventh season of the TV series, 24.
 The FBI Police was featured in the first episode of the TV series, The Blacklist.

Gallery

See also 

 Federal police
 List of FBI field offices
 List of protective service agencies
 List of United States federal law enforcement agencies
 Federal Protective Service

References

External links

Agency-specific police departments of the United States
Police
Law enforcement agencies of the District of Columbia
United States Department of Justice agencies